The Lomax is a British kit car based on mechanical components of the Citroën 2CV. It has been in production since 1982 when it was introduced by the Lomax Motor Co of Willoughton, Gainsborough, Lincolnshire. In the late 1980s the production was transferred to the Mumford Motor Co. of Gigg Mill, Nailsworth, Gloucestershire, where it was produced until the early 1990s. From then it was built at Cradley Motor Works in Cradley Heath, West Midlands. By 2009 the car was being made by Cradley Motor Works of St Leonard's-on-Sea, East Sussex. It was designed by Nigel Whall. From the early 1990s the Lomax has also been sold in the Netherlands and Germany.

Design
The design is slightly reminiscent of the legendary Morgan Three Wheeler of the 1930s. The car consists of a fibreglass body mounted on an un-modified Citroën 2CV or Dyane floorpan and engine. Later a steel tube chassis was introduced.
A Lomax is usually an open 2-seat roadster, which is driven completely without a roof. 

The original 1982 prototype had a bespoke four-wheel chassis which was specially constructed, and of shorter wheelbase than the donor car, a Citroën Ami. 
Early "3-wheel" variants were actually four wheeled, with two rear wheels closely paired as in some Heinkel bubble cars of the 1960s. Later versions were genuine trikes, three wheels with two wheels in front and one at the back, this allowed to benefit from the (lower) 3-wheel UK road-tax. 
A four-wheel variant followed later, using an unmodified 2CV chassis. 
The naming convention was the number of cylinders, the number of seats, and the number of wheels. The common model designations are 223 (2 cylinders - 2 seats - 3 wheels) or 224 (2 cylinders - 2 seats - 4 wheels). A few examples used the engine from the Citroën GS or GSA, these were designated 424 (4 cylinders, 2 seats, 4 wheels).

Petrol consumption is -.

In media
 A Lomax sold for $7,100 on a 2011 episode of the U.S. television series Auction Kings.
The Lomax 224 was used as a car produced by a company in the UK TV series Frank Stubbs Promotes starring Timothy Spall

References

External links

Cradley Motor Works, Lomax manufacturers
Lomax-Club
Flymall Wheels & Wings Tech Tip Page http://flymall.org/magento/index.php/tech-tips/lomax.html

Citroën 2CV
Front-wheel-drive vehicles
1990s cars
Cars powered by boxer engines
Kit car manufacturers
Motor vehicle manufacturers of England
Cars introduced in 1982